Joseph Jez is a Howard Hughes Medical Institute Professor and Spencer T. Olin Professor of Biology at Washington University in St. Louis. He has served as the Chair of the Washington University Biology Department since 2018. His research focuses on the effect of environmental changes on biochemical pathways in plants, aiming to apply this research to present-day agricultural and environmental issues.

Education and career
Joseph Jez attended Pennsylvania State University in University Park, Pennsylvania for his undergraduate studies. At Pennsylvania State University, he obtained a B.S. in Biochemistry and a minor in English, graduating with honors in 1992. He later obtained a PhD in Biochemistry and Molecular Biophysics at the University of Pennsylvania in 1998. At the University of Pennsylvania, he conducted research under Professor Trevor M. Penning. His thesis was titled, "Steroid Recognition and Engineering of Catalysis in Mammalian Aldo-Keto Reductases." Jez served as an NIH-NRSA postdoctoral research fellow with Professor Joseph Noel from 1998 to 2001 at The Salk Institute for Biological Studies in La Jolla, California, where he studied the structure, mechanisms, and engineering of plant polyketide biosynthesis. 

He worked at Kosan Biosciences from 2001 to 2002, before moving to St. Louis.  From 2002 to 2010, Jez was an Assistant Member and Principal Investigator at the Donald Danforth Plant Science Center in St. Louis, Missouri. In 2008, he became a faculty member in the Department of Biology at Washington University in St. Louis.  Currently, Jez is a Spencer T. Olin Professor of Biology at Washington University in St. Louis. He was named a Howard Hughes Medical Institute Professor in 2014. At Washington University, he established the Biotech Explorers Pathway program, which is a two-year academic program for undergraduate students interested in the interconnections of science, business, technology, and engineering. He also teaches an upper-level biochemistry laboratory course for undergraduate students interested in conducting research at a more advanced level.

Research focus
Jez currently conducts research on the effect of environmental changes on the biochemical pathway of plants with the aim to produce engineered systems that will address present-day agricultural and environmental problems. His laboratory uses x-ray crystallography, enzymology, molecular biology, proteomics, and plant biology. His research is centered around three general ideas: metabolic regulation and environmental responses in plants, enzymatic control of plant hormone responses, and the use of C. elegans to study new metabolic pathways in nematodes.

Publications 
Jez has nearly 12,000 citations in Google Scholar and an h-index of 60.

 Google Scholar Citations

Selected publications

Awards and recognition

Awards and Fellowships
 American Association for Advancement of Science (Fellow, 2018)
 Howard Hughes Medical Institute Professor (2014)
 Fulbright Senior Specialist Fellowship (2012)
 National Key Laboratory of Crop Genetic Improvement, Huazhong Agricultural University (International Scholar, 2007–2013)
 Arthur C. Neish Young Investigator Award, Phytochemical Society of North America (2007)
 Presidential Early Career Award for Scientists & Engineers (PECASE) (2005)

Societies and Academies
 Faculty of 1000 - Plant Biochemistry & Physiology (2019–present)
 American Society of Plant Biologists Education Committee (2018–present)
 American Society of Plant Biologists SURF Program Committee (2011–2018)
 Plant Metabolic Engineering Gordon Research Conference (Co-Chair, 2017)
 McDonnell International Scholars Academy, China Agricultural University (Ambassador, 2015–present)

Editor of Scientific Journals
 The Journal of Biological Chemistry (associate editor, 2016-present; editorial board, 2008–2016)
 Biochemical Journal (editorial board, 2013–present)
 Encyclopedia of Biological Chemistry, 3rd Edition, (editor-in-chief, 2018–2021)
 Emerging Topics in Life Sciences (guest editor, 2020–2021)
 Plant Cell Reports (guest editor, 2017–2018)
 Plant Science (guest editor, 2017–2018)

References

External links 
 The Once and Future Green Factory | Joe Jez | TEDxGatewayArch

Year of birth missing (living people)
Living people
Washington University in St. Louis faculty
Pennsylvania State University alumni
University of Pennsylvania alumni
People from Fairbanks, Alaska